Blenheim  is a town in Marlboro County, South Carolina, United States. The population was 154 at the 2010 census.  It is named for Blenheim Palace in Oxfordshire, England. Blenheim Palace was the residence of the Duke of Marlborough, after whom Marlboro County is named.

Blenheim Ginger Ale was originally bottled in Blenheim, with the local mineral water.

Geography
Blenheim is located at  (34.507513, -79.653088).

Demographics

As of the census of 2000, there were 138 people, 63 households, and 36 families residing in the town. The population density was 210.1 people per square mile (81.4/km2). There were 78 housing units at an average density of 119.6 per square mile (46.3/km2). The racial makeup of the town was 43.07% White, 54.74% African American and 2.19% Native American.

There were 63 households, out of which 15.9% had children under the age of 18 living with them, 41.3% were married couples living together, 15.9% had a female householder with no husband present, and 41.3% were non-families. 41.3% of all households were made up of individuals, and 17.5% had someone living alone who was 65 years of age or older. The average household size was 2.17 and the average family size was 2.97.

In the town, the population was spread out, with 17.5% under the age of 18, 6.6% from 18 to 24, 27.0% from 25 to 44, 29.2% from 45 to 64, and 19.7% who were 65 years of age or older. The median age was 44 years. For every 100 females, there were 77.9 males. For every 100 females age 18 and over, there were 82.3 males.

The median income for a household in the town was $26,667, and the median income for a family was $40,625. Males had a median income of $28,750 versus $18,750 for females. The per capita income for the town was $17,840. There were 22.6% of families and 15.5% of the population living below the poverty line, including no under eighteens and 44.0% of those over 64.

References

Towns in Marlboro County, South Carolina
Towns in South Carolina